Lucas Manuel Poletto (born 20 June 1994) is an Argentine professional footballer who plays as a midfielder or forward.

Career
Poletto started his career with local team Sportivo Suardi, appearing in Liga San Francisco from the age of fifteen. In 2014, Sportivo Belgrano signed Poletto. He began featuring in the 2015 Primera B Nacional, appearing for his professional debut on 5 April during a 1–1 home draw with Estudiantes. He scored his first goal in the succeeding June against Ferro Carril Oeste, in a season that concluded with relegation to Torneo Federal A. One goal in twenty-two matches followed in tier three, before the player left in July 2017 to Deportivo Morón. He played five times in 2017–18 as they placed eleventh under Walter Otta.

On 9 July 2018, Poletto joined Primera B Metropolitana side Colegiales on loan. His first goal arrived in a fixture versus Justo José de Urquiza in April 2019, in the midst of thirty-one total appearances for them as they reached the play-offs; losing out to San Telmo. In July 2019, Poletto left Deportivo Morón permanently to sign with Torneo Federal A's Estudiantes; the opponents of his career debut. After five matches in the third tier, Poletto moved abroad for the first time as he penned terms with Football League Greece outfit Aspropyrgos ahead of January 2020. He scored his first goal for the club on 7 March versus Ialysos.

Career statistics
.

References

External links

1994 births
Living people
Argentine footballers
Argentine expatriate footballers
People from San Cristóbal Department
Association football midfielders
Association football forwards
Sportspeople from Santa Fe Province
Primera Nacional players
Torneo Federal A players
Primera B Metropolitana players
Football League (Greece) players
Sportivo Belgrano footballers
Deportivo Morón footballers
Club Atlético Colegiales (Argentina) players
Club Sportivo Estudiantes players
Enosi Panaspropyrgiakou Doxas players
Argentine expatriate sportspeople in Greece
Expatriate footballers in Greece